Marianne Aminoff (21 September 1916 – 14 April 1984) was a Swedish film actress. She was born in Uddevalla, Sweden and died in Stockholm.

Partial filmography

 John Ericsson, Victor of Hampton Roads (1937) - Mary
 Thunder and Lightning (1938) - Inga, Puttes kusin
 Styrman Karlssons flammor (1938) - Juanita (uncredited)
 Herr husassistenten (1938) - Flower shop assistant
 Good Friends and Faithful Neighbours (1938) - Greta Ask
 Wanted (1939) - Linnéa
 Frun tillhanda (1939) - Eva
 Mot nya tider (1939) - Eva, deras dotter, som vuxen
 June Night (1940) - Nickan
 Her Melody (1940) - Gullan Karlsson
 One, But a Lion! (1940) - Linda Lejon
 Med dej i mina armar (1940) - Britt
 Magistrarna på sommarlov (1941) - Anna-Lisa
 The Poor Millionaire (1941) - Gittan Svensson
 En sjöman i frack (1942) - Madeleine Haller
 Take Care of Ulla (1942) - Ulla Lundin
 Live Dangerously (1944) - Marion
 Vändkorset (1944) - Ulla le Fort
 Botte i farten (1945) - Ingrid Borg
 I Roslagens famn (1945) - Carmencita
 The Balloon (1946) - Vanda Novak
 Between Brothers (1946) - Ingeborg Brodd
 Här kommer vi... (1947) - Anne-Marie Stålhammar
 Var sin väg (1948) - Sonja Collin
 Sista ringen (1955) - Maria Valberg
 Det är aldrig för sent (1956) - Birgit Karpell
 My Passionate Longing (1956) - Mrs. Grönberg
 Värmlänningarna (1957) - the Gracious wife
 Bröllopet (1973) - Frida Frohm
 Vita Nejlikan (1974) - Assistant Jeweller
 The Last Adventure (1974) - Jimmy's Mother
 Face to Face (1976) - Jenny's Mother
 Långt borta och nära (1976) - Old Woman
 Paradise Place (1977) - Christina
 Mackan (1977) - French teacher
 Autumn Sonata (1978) - Charlotte's private secretary
 Der Mann, der sich in Luft auflöste (1980) - Mrs. Lindberg
 Fanny and Alexander (1982) - Blenda Vergérus - Biskopsgården

References

External links

1916 births
1984 deaths
People from Uddevalla Municipality
Swedish film actresses
20th-century Swedish actresses
Marianne